Nachoem Mesoelam (Nachoem) Wijnberg (Amsterdam, 13 April 1961) is a poet and author from the Netherlands. He studied at the University of Amsterdam and received his Ph.D. at the Rotterdam School of Management. Since 2005 he is lecturing business administration at the University of Amsterdam. In 2008 he won the Ida Gerhardt Poëzieprijs. In 2018, Wijnberg won the P.C. Hooft Award for his entire oeuvre.

Bibliography 
 2016 - Uit tien
 2015 - Van groot belang
 2013 - Nog een grap
 2011 - Als ik als eerste aankom
 2009 - Divan van Ghalib (Poem)
 2008 - Het leven van (Poem)
 2006 - Liedjes (Poem)
 2005 - De opvolging (Novel)
 2004 - Eerst dit dan dat (Poem)
 2003 - Uit 7 (Poem)
 2002 - Politiek en liefde (Novel)
 2001 - Vogels (Poem)
 1999 - De joden (Novel)
 1997 - Landschapsseks (Novel)
 1998 - Alvast (Poem)
 1996 - Geschenken (Poem)
 1994 - Is het dan goed (Poem)
 1993 - Langzaam en zacht (Poem)
 1991 - De expeditie naar Cathay (Poem)
 1990 - De voorstelling in de nachtclub (Poem)
 1989 - De simulatie van de schepping (Poem)

References

1961 births
Living people
Dutch male poets
Erasmus University Rotterdam alumni
Academic staff of the University of Amsterdam
Writers from Amsterdam